Glinojeck  is a town in Poland, with 3,087 inhabitants (2004).

History
A sugar refinery was founded in a Glinojeck in 1858.

During the German occupation (World War II), disabled people from Glinojeck were murdered by the Germans in a massacre carried out in February 1940 in the nearby village of Ościsłowo.

References

Cities and towns in Masovian Voivodeship
Ciechanów County
Warsaw Voivodeship (1919–1939)